The Zhejiang Yue Opera Troupe is a troupe in Hangzhou, China, founded in 1952 and dedicated to Yue opera. The Zhejiang Yue Opera Troupe is one of the most famous Yueju troupes.

Repertoire 
The list of Yueju works performed by Zhejiang Yue Opera Troupe include Kong Yiji, Liu Yuniang, A Bird Account for Nine Deaths, "Major Case in Qing dynasty", etc.

Notable actors 
The famous members of the troupe include: Yao Shuijuan, Zhou Yunjuan, Shu Jinxia, Wang Binmei, etc.

References

1952 establishments in China
Yue opera troupes